Kwansei Gakuin Institute of Business and Accounting (KGIBA) is one of the professional schools of Kwansei Gakuin University, and one of the Japan's leading management schools.

The institute was founded in 2005 with an initial class of 162 students. It is located in Nishinomiya, Hyōgo and Umeda district, Osaka City. KGIBA will have approximately 200 students per year in its two-year master programs.  The institute has two schools: Business School and Accounting School. KG Business School offers a full-time MBA program in International Business for new graduates and International students and a part-time MBA program in Management for accomplished mid-career executives, while KG Accounting School does a full-time MBA program in Accounting.

See also
Business school
MBA
Entrepreneurship

External links
 http://www.kwansei-ac.jp/iba/imc/index.html
 http://www.kwansei-ac.jp/iba/index.html

University departments in Japan
Business schools in Japan